Shōnan, shounan, or shonan may refer to:

Education
Shonan Fujisawa Campus, a research-oriented campus of Keio University located in the city of Fujisawa, Kanagawa Prefecture, Japan
Keio Shonan-Fujisawa Junior and Senior High School, a junior and senior high school in Fujisawa, Kanagawa Prefecture, Japan
Shonan Institute of Technology, a private university in Fujisawa, Kanagawa, Japan
Shonan Institute of Technology High School, a high school in Kanagawa, Japan
Shonan Junior College, a private junior college in Yokosuka, Kanagawa Prefecture, Japan
Shonan Junior College of Technology, a private junior college in Yokohama, Japan

Locations
Shōnan, a region along the coast of Sagami Bay in Kanagawa Prefecture, Japan
Shōnan, Chiba, a town in Higashikatsushika District, Chiba Prefecture, Japan

People
Yokoi Shōnan (1809-1869), a Bakumatsu and early Meiji period scholar and political reformer in Japan

Sport
Shonan Bellmare, a Japanese professional football (soccer) club
Shonan Bellmare futsal, a Japanese professional futsal club
Shonan BMW Stadium Hiratsuka, a multi-purpose stadium in Hiratsuka, Kanagawa, Japan

Transport
Shōnan (train), a commuter railway service on the Tōkaidō Main Line operated by JR East in Japan
Shonan Monorail, a suspended monorail in Kamakura and Fujisawa, Kanagawa Prefecture, Japan
Shōnan Station, a railway station on the Saitama New Urban Transit New Shuttle in Ageo, Saitama, Japan
Shōnan-Enoshima Station, a monorail train station on the Shōnan Monorail in Fujisawa, Kanagawa Prefecture, Japan
Shōnan-Fukasawa Station, a monorail train station on the Shōnan Monorail in Kamakura, Kanagawa Prefecture, Japan
Shōnan-Machiya Station, a monorail train station on the Shōnan Monorail in Kamakura, Kanagawa Prefecture, Japan
Shōnan–Shinjuku Line, a passenger railway service in Japan
Shinshōnan Bypass, a 4-laned toll road in Kanagawa Prefecture, Japan

Other
MV Shōnan Maru 2, a Japanese security vessel operated by the Japanese Fisheries Agency
Shonan Beach FM, a radio station in Kanagawa Prefecture, Japan
Shonan Gold, a hybrid Japanese citrus
Shonan Junai Gumi, a manga by Tohru Fujisawa
GTO: 14 Days in Shonan, a spinoff of the sequel to Shonan Junai Gumi
Shōnan no Kaze, a Japanese four member reggae band

See also
Shōnen (disambiguation)